Clay Township is one of fourteen townships in Dearborn County, Indiana. As of the 2010 census, its population was 2,966 and it contained 1,271 housing units.

History
Clay Township was organized in 1835.

Geography

Cities and towns
 Dillsboro

Major highways
  U.S. Route 50
  State Road 62
  State Road 262

Cemeteries
The township contains four cemeteries: Conaway, Oakdale, Spangler and Windsor.

Education
Clay Township residents may obtain a library card at the Aurora Public Library in Aurora.

References
 
 United States Census Bureau cartographic boundary files

External links

 Indiana Township Association
 United Township Association of Indiana

Townships in Dearborn County, Indiana
Townships in Indiana